Crooked Run is a  long 2nd order tributary to the Trent River in Jones County, North Carolina.

Course
Crooked Run rises about 5 miles southwest of Olivers Crossroads, North Carolina and then flows north-northwest and then turns east to join the Trent River about 0.25 miles southeast of Trenton.

Watershed
Crooked Run drains  of area, receives about 53.3 in/year of precipitation, has a wetness index of 647.73, and is about 16% forested.

See also
List of rivers of North Carolina

References

Rivers of North Carolina
Rivers of Jones County, North Carolina